David "Dato" Turashvili (born May 10, 1966 in Tbilisi) is a Georgian fiction writer.

Biography
In 1989, he was one of the leaders of the student protest action taking place at the Davidgareja monasteries in eastern Georgia, whose territory was exploited by the Soviet Union military as a training ground. His first novels, published in 1988, are based on the turmoil of those events. The premier of his play Jeans Generation was held in May 2001. Turashvili's other publications include the travelogues Known and Unknown America (1993) and Kathmandu (1998), and two collections of short fiction and movie scripts; his first collection of short fiction is Merani (1991).

Besides scripts, he writes novels, short stories and plays. Dato Turashvili has published about 16 books in Georgia. His works are translated into seven languages and published in different periodical editions of various countries. His novel Flight from the USSR has already been published in five European countries. He is the author of Georgian best-sellers and has participated in Mountaineers' expedition in the mountains of the Caucasus, Andes and Himalayas. Furthermore, he is the author of scientific-research letters in literary criticism and historiography. He has translated both prosaic and poetic texts from Russian, English, Spanish, and Turkish.

Bibliography
A Collection of Short Stories (1991)
Known and Unknown America (1993)
Festival of Loneliness (1995)
Where did Sumerians Go (1997)
My Irish Grandfather (1999)
Kathmandu (1998)
Tibet is not Far Away (2001)
A Night of a Sunken City (2003)
Black Sneakers (2006)
Gurji Khatun (2007)
Jeans Generation (2008)
The Thirteenth (2009)
American Fairy Tales (2010)
If I were a Football Player (2011)
While Waiting for Dodo (2012)
Once upon a Time (2012)
The King of Woods (2013)
Another Amsterdam (2014)

Plays
One Fine Day (1991), Kutaisi Drama Theatre
Dialogues in Train (1993), Rustaveli Theatre
Troubadour (1997), Manhattan Theatrical Studio and Tkibuli Public Theatre
Jeans Generation (2001), Free Theatre
Green Horizon (2003), Free Theatre
Two Islands in the Black Sea (2005), Bolnisi Theatre
Tomorrow they will fly above our Garden (2007), “Come and See” Theatre
Border Line (2008), Marjanishvili Theatre
Black Sneakers (2009), Free Theatre
Euro-Georgia (2011), Marjanishvili Theatre
While Waiting for Dodo (2012), Akhaltsikhe Theatre
While Waiting for Dodo (2013), Marjanishvili Theatre

Translations
Jeans Generation, Translated into Dutch by Ingrid Dekhrave, publishing house Cossee (2013)
Jeans Generation, translated into Croatian, publishing house Sandorf (2013)
Jeans Generation, translated into Italian by Ketevan Charkviani, Publishing house Palombi Editori (2013)
Jeans Generation, translated into Turkish by Fahrettin Çiloğlu, Publishing house Ezgi Kitabevi (2012)

Awards
 Literary Award “Saba” in the nomination for “The Best Novel” - Black Sneakers (2008)

References

See also
 Tbilisi hijacking incident
 List of Georgians

1966 births
Living people
Male writers from Georgia (country)
Writers from Tbilisi
International Writing Program alumni